Acanthiophilus summissus is a species of tephritid or fruit flies in the genus Acanthiophilus of the family Tephritidae.

References

Tephritinae
Insects described in 2015
Diptera of Africa